Virpi is a feminine given name. Notable people with the surname include:

Virpi Hämeen-Anttila (born 1958), Finnish writer and translator
Virpi Juutilainen (born 1961), Finnish ski-orienteering competitor
Virpi Lummaa, Finnish evolutionary biologist
Virpi Moskari, Finnish Mezzo-soprano
Virpi Niemelä (1936–2006), Finnish Argentine astronomer
Virpi Niemi (born 1966), Finnish cross-country skier
Virpi Sarasvuo (born 1976), Finnish cross-country skier
Virpi Talvitie (born 1961), Finnish illustrator

Finnish feminine given names